Torodora angustia is a moth in the family Lecithoceridae. It was described by Kyu-Tek Park in 2007. It is found in Thailand.

The wingspan is 13.5-14.5 mm.

Etymology
The species name refers to the narrow forewing and is derived from Latin angustus (meaning narrow).

References

Moths described in 2007
Torodora